The Marjing Polo Statue is a colossal classical equestrian statue of a player of Sagol Kangjei, riding a Meitei horse (Manipuri pony), constructed at the Marjing Polo Complex, the sacred sports site dedicated to God Marjing, the ancient Meitei deity of polo and horses, in Heingang, Imphal East District, Kangleipak.
It is the world's tallest statue of a polo player.
It is built to commemorate the game of "modern polo" being originated from Kangleipak.

Description 

The gigantic polo statue stands above a pedestal of a three-storey building, with recreational facilities. 

The statue's inner structure is made of steel and its outer surface is covered by bronze. Its design is prepared by Professor Somnath Ghose of Jadavpur University.

Prior to the construction of the statue, a roadway was made up to the base of the place where the statue was to be built, for which permission was granted to the construction team by the Ministry of Environment and Forest.

Inauguration 
On 6 January 2023, the Marjing Polo Statue was inaugurated by Amit Shah, the then Minister of Home Affairs of the Union Government of India, in the presence of Nongthombam Biren, the then Chief Minister of Manipur, at a function organised by the Department of Tourism, Government of Manipur.

Regarding the inauguration, Amit Shah stated:

Significance 
Nongthombam Biren, the Chief Minister of Manipur, said that the 122 feet tall Marjing polo statue will "highlight the significance of the birthplace of Polo and revive the glory of Manipur".
He also stressed the significance of the statue, being the tallest and the biggest polo statue, inaugurated in recognition of Sagol Kangjei, Arambai, etc.

See also 
 Daughters of the Polo God
 Hapta Kangjeibung
 Manipuri Pony (film)
 Manung Kangjeibung
 Polo in India

Notes

References

External links 
 Marjing Polo Statue at 

2022 sculptures
2023 sculptures
Bronze sculptures in India
Colossal statues in India
Cultural heritage of India
Equestrian statues in India
Landmarks in India
Meitei culture
Monuments and memorials in India
Monuments and memorials in Imphal
Monuments and memorials in Manipur
Monuments and memorials to Meitei people
Monuments and memorials to Meitei royalties
Outdoor sculptures in India
Polo in India
Public art in India
Sport in India
Steel sculptures
Tourist attractions in India